This was a new event in the 2015 ITF Women's Circuit.

Misaki Doi won the title, defeating Zhang Kailin in the final, 6–3, 6–3.

Seeds

Main draw

Finals

Top half

Bottom half

References 
 Main draw

ITF Women's Circuit - Hong Kong - Singles